Tales of the Night is a 1992 French silhouette animation television special written and directed by Michel Ocelot. It aired on Canal+ in France, ZDF in Germany and Channel 4 in the United Kingdom. It is a trilogy of three further fairy tales in much the same format as Ciné si.

Plot
A boy, a girl and an old technician get together in an abandoned cinema to invent stories, the boy and the girl play after then made costumes. The three stories are "" ("The Pretty Girl and the Sorcerer"), "" ("The Dancing Shepherdess") and "" ("The Prince of Jewels"). Unlike La Princesse insensible and Ciné si, Tales of the Night is on 35 mm film.

Release
"Le Prince des joyaux" was also shown in French cinemas in 1994 (and later released on VHS) as part of the Folimage-organised package film Le Petit Cirque et autres contes. All three individual segments (though still lacking the original opening, ending and bridging segments) were made available on DVD-Video with the release of Les Trésors cachés de Michel Ocelot in 2008.

References

External links
 Interview with excerpts from "Le Prince des joyaux"
 Another interview with stills from all three stories
 Michel Ocelot short films at Le Palais des dessins animés
 

Animated television specials
1992 television specials
British television specials
Films directed by Michel Ocelot
Silhouettes
1992 films